Paspardo is a comune in the province of Brescia, in Lombardy. It is situated in Val Camonica. Neighbouring communes are Capo di Ponte, Cedegolo and Cimbergo.

References

Cities and towns in Lombardy